Lodes may refer to:

 Lode, an economic mineral deposit

People
 Birgit Lodes (born 1967), German musicologist
  (1909–2006), German doctor

Places
 Cambridgeshire Lodes, a network of artificial drainage channels in England
 Lodes, Haute-Garonne, France
 , in Tārgale Parish, Latvia

See also
 Lode (disambiguation)